The word(s) of the year, sometimes capitalized as "Word(s) of the Year" and abbreviated "WOTY" (or "WotY"), refers to any of various assessments as to the most important word(s) or expression(s) in the public sphere during a specific year.

The German tradition, Wort des Jahres was started in 1971. The American Dialect Society's Word of the Year is the oldest English-language version, and the only one that is announced after the end of the calendar year, determined by a vote of independent linguists, and not tied to commercial interest. However, various other organizations also announce Words of the Year for a variety of purposes.

American Dialect Society

Since 1990, the American Dialect Society (ADS) has designated one or more words or terms to be the "Word of the Year" in the United States.

In addition to the "Word of the Year", the society also selects words in other categories that vary from year to year. These categories have occurred in several years:
 Most useful
 Most creative
 Most unnecessary
 Most outrageous
 Most euphemistic
 Most likely to succeed
 Least likely to succeed

Australian National Dictionary Centre

The Australian National Dictionary Centre has announced a Word of the Year each since 2006.  The word is chosen by the editorial staff, and is selected on the basis of having come to some prominence in the Australian social and cultural landscape during the year. The Word of the Year is often reported in the media as being Australia's word of the year, but the word is not always an Australian word.

Cambridge Dictionary 

The Cambridge Dictionary Word of the Year, by Cambridge University Press & Assessment, has been published every year since 2015. 

The Cambridge Word of the Year is led by the data - what users look up - in the world's most popular dictionary for English language learners. 

In 2022, the Cambridge Word of the Year was 'homer', caused by Wordle players looking up five-letter words, especially those that non-American players were less familiar with. 

In 2021, the Cambridge Dictionary Word of the Year was 'perseverance'. In 2020, 'quarantine'.

Collins English Dictionary 
The Collins English Dictionary has announced a Word of the Year every year since 2013, and prior to this, announced a new 'word of the month' each month in 2012. Published in Glasgow, UK, Collins English Dictionary has been publishing English dictionaries since 1819.

Toward the end of each calendar year, Collins release a shortlist of notable words or those that have come to prominence in the previous 12 months. The shortlist typically comprises ten words, though in 2014 only four words were announced as the Word of the Year shortlist.

The Collins Words of the Year are selected by the Collins Dictionary team across Glasgow and London, consisting of lexicographers, editorial, marketing, and publicity staff, though previously the selection process has been open to the public.

Whilst the word is not required to be new to feature, the appearance of words in the list is often supported by usage statistics and cross-reference against Collins' extensive corpus to understand how language may have changed or developed in the previous year. The Collins Word of the Year is also not restricted to UK language usage, and words are often chosen that apply internationally as well, for example, fake news in 2017.

Macquarie Dictionary 

The Macquarie Dictionary, which is the dictionary of Australian English, updates the online dictionary each year with new words, phrases, and definitions. These can be viewed on their website.

Each year the editors select a short-list of new words added to the dictionary and invite the public to vote on their favourite. The public vote is held in January and results in the People's Choice winner. The most influential word of the year is also selected by the Word of the Year Committee which is chaired by the Vice-Chancellor of the University of Sydney, Dr Michael Spence. The Editor of the Macquarie Dictionary, Susan Butler, is also a committee member. The Committee meets annually to select the overall winning words.

The following is the list of winning words since the Macquarie Word of the Year first began in 2006:

Merriam-Webster

The lists of Merriam-Webster's Words of the Year (for each year) are ten-word lists published annually by the American dictionary-publishing company Merriam-Webster, Inc., which feature the ten words of the year from the English language. These word lists started in 2003 and have been published at the end of each year. At first, Merriam-Webster determined its contents by analyzing page hits and popular searches on its website. Since 2006, the list has been determined by an online poll and by suggestions from visitors to the website.

The following is the list of words that became Merriam-Webster's Word of the Year since 2003:
 2003: democracy
 2004: blog
 2005: integrity
 2006: truthiness
 2007: w00t
 2008: bailout
 2009: admonish
 2010: austerity
 2011: pragmatic
 2012: socialism and capitalism
 2013: science
 2014: culture
 2015: -ism
 2016: surreal
 2017: feminism
 2018: justice
 2019: they
2020: pandemic
2021: vaccine
 2022: gaslighting

Oxford

Oxford University Press, which publishes the Oxford English Dictionary and many other dictionaries, announces an Oxford Dictionaries UK Word of the Year and an Oxford Dictionaries US Word of the Year; sometimes these are the same word. The Word of the Year need not have been coined within the past twelve months but it does need to have become prominent or notable during that time. There is no guarantee that the Word of the Year will be included in any Oxford dictionary. The Oxford Dictionaries Words of the Year are selected by editorial staff from each of the Oxford dictionaries. The selection team is made up of lexicographers and consultants to the dictionary team, and editorial, marketing, and publicity staff.

Grant Barrett
Since 2004, lexicographer Grant Barrett has published a words-of-the-year list, usually in The New York Times, though he does not name a winner.
 2004
 2005
 2006
 2007
 2008
 2009
 2010
 2011
 2012
 2013 in New York Times, also a more complete list
 2014 in Dallas Morning News

Dictionary.com
In 2010, Dictionary.com announced its first word of the year, 'change', and has done so in December every year since. The selection is based on search trends on the site throughout the year and the news events that drive them.

The following is the list of annual words since beginning with the first in 2010:
 2010: Change
 2011: Tergiversate
 2012: Bluster
 2013: Privacy
 2014: Exposure
 2015: Identity
 2016: Xenophobia
 2017: Complicit
 2018: Misinformation
 2019: Existential
2020: Pandemic
2021: Allyship
2022: Woman

Similar word lists

A Word a Year
Since 2004, Susie Dent, an English lexicographer has published a column, "A Word a Year", in which she chooses a single word from each of the last 101 years to represent preoccupations of the time. Susie Dent notes that the list is subjective. Each year, she gives a completely different set of words.

Since Susie Dent works for the Oxford University Press, her words of choice are often incorrectly referred to as "Oxford Dictionary's Word of the Year".

Other countries
In Germany, a Wort des Jahres has been selected since 1972 (for year 1971) by the Society of the German Language. In addition, an Unwort des Jahres (Un-word of the year or No-no Word of the Year) has been nominated since 1991, for a word or phrase in public speech deemed insulting or socially inappropriate (such as "Überfremdung"). Similar selections are made each year since 1999 in Austria, 2002 in Liechtenstein, and 2003 in Switzerland. Since 2008, language publisher Langenscheidt supports a search for the German youth word of the year, which aims to find new words entering the language through the vernacular of young people.

In Denmark, the Word of the year has been selected since 2008 by Danmarks Radio and Dansk Sprognævn.

In Japan, the Kanji of the year (kotoshi no kanji) has been selected since 1995. Kanji are adopted Chinese characters in Japanese language. Japan also runs an annual word of the year contest called " U-Can New and Trendy Word Grand Prix" (U-Can shingo, ryūkōgo taishō) sponsored by Jiyu Kokuminsha. Both the kanji and word/phrases of the year are often reflective of Japanese current events and attitudes. For example, in 2011 following the Fukushima power plant disaster, the frustratingly enigmatic phrase used by Japanese officials before the explosion regarding the possibility of meltdown – "the possibility of recriticality is not zero" (Sairinkai no kanōsei zero de wa nai) – became the top phrase of the year. In the same year, the kanji indicating 'bond' (i.e. familial bond or friendship) became the kanji of the year, expressing the importance of collectiveness in the face of disaster.

In Norway, the Word of the year poll is carried out since 2012.

In Portugal, the Word of the year poll is carried out since 2009.

In Russia, the Word of the year poll is carried out since 2007.

In Spain, the Word of the year is carried out by Fundéu since 2013.

In Ukraine, the Word of the year poll is carried out since 2013.

See also
 Language Report from Oxford University Press
 Lists of Merriam-Webster's Words of the Year
 Neologism
 Doublespeak Award
 Kanji of the year

Further reading
 John Ayto, "A Century of New Words", Series: Oxford Paperback Reference (2007) 
 John Ayto, "Twentieth Century Words", Oxford University Press (1999)

Notes

References

External links
 Top words from 2000 – present @ Global Language Monitor
 Word of the Year Archive @ Macquarie Dictionary
 Word of the Year Archive @ Merriam-Webster
 Word of the Year Archive @ OxfordWords blog
 Austrian Word of the Year
 Canadian Word of the Year
 Liechtenstein Word of the Year
 Switzerland Word of the Year
 Dictionary.com word of the year @ Dictionary.com

 
Lists of words